Frances Esther Karttunen (born 1942), also known as Frances Ruley Karttunen, is an American academic linguist, historian and author.

Education and career 
She received her BA in 1964 from Harvard and her PhD in 1970 from Indiana University. 

In her linguistics career Karttunen has specialised in the study of Mesoamerican languages such as Mayan but in particular Nahuatl, on which topic she has authored seven books and numerous academic papers. She has also written about endangered languages, linguistic diversity and language translation. Early in her career Karttunen also produced several studies of Finnish phonology and syntax.

As a historian Karttunen has published research in areas such as historical Mesoamerican literature, colonial-era Aztec and Nahua history, and the social organizations, socio-political concerns and literacy rates of indigenous peoples of Mexico. Karttunen has also written and lectured about the local history of Nantucket.

Her 1976 publication Nahuatl in the Middle Years: Language Contact Phenomena in Texts of the Colonial Period, with James Lockhart, is a foundational text for the New Philology. She followed this by an insightful article on Nahua literacy, showing how the Mesoamerican tradition of pictorial writing then transitioned to alphabetic writing in Latin letters by local-level notaries in a self-perpetuating tradition.   Her 1997 article, "Rethinking Malinche", on La Malinche, known in the colonial era as Doña Marina, is a significant revisionist take on the choices that Cortés' cultural translator and consort faced and took.

She also published An Analytical Dictionary of Nahuatl and several iterations of a Foundation Course in Nahuatl Grammar, culminating in the 1994 edition (with linguist R. Joe Campbell).

Most of her academic career was spent in association with the University of Texas at Austin, where she held researcher and lecturer positions for over 30 years, until her retirement in 2000 as senior university research scientist at the Linguistics Research Center. She was married to historian Alfred W. Crosby.

Selected publications 

 Between Worlds: Interpreters, Guides and Survivors. New Brunswick: Rutgers University Press, 1994.
 "From Court Yard to the Seat of Government: The Career of Antonio Valeriano, Nahua Colleague of Bernardino de Sahagún". Amerindia Revue d'Etholonguistique Amérindienne, n. 20, 1995, pp. 113–120.
 "Interpreters Snatched from the Shore: The Successful and The Others". In Edward G. Gray and Norman Fiering (eds.) The Language Encounter in the Americas, 1492-1800. New Work: Berghahn Books, 2000, pp. 215–229.

References

External links 
Photograph of Frances Karttunen by Philip Spalding III
 Frances Karttunen's website
Audio file of "Rethinking Malinche" Part 1, read by Frances Karttunen
Audio file of "Rethinking Malinche" Part 2, read by Frances Karttunen
 
 

Living people
1942 births
Linguists from the United States
Women linguists
21st-century American historians
American Mesoamericanists
Women Mesoamericanists
Linguists of Mesoamerican languages
Aztec scholars
20th-century Mesoamericanists
People from Nantucket, Massachusetts
Radcliffe College alumni
Indiana University alumni
University of Texas at Austin faculty
Linguists of Uto-Aztecan languages
Historians from Massachusetts
American women historians
21st-century American women